Henry Cheetham (27 April 1827 – 22 December 1899) was an Anglican bishop, Bishop of Sierra Leone from 1870 until 1882.

Henry Cheetham was born in Nottingham and educated in Nottingham and at Christ's College, Cambridge. Ordained in 1856, he was Vicar of Quarndon, Derbyshire until his appointment to the colonial episcopate. He died in Bournemouth on 22 December 1899. Doctor of Divinity (DD) 1871.

References

1827 births
People from Nottingham
Alumni of Christ's College, Cambridge
19th-century Anglican bishops in Sierra Leone
English Anglican missionaries
Anglican missionaries in Sierra Leone
Anglican bishops of Sierra Leone
1899 deaths
People from Quarndon